40-Horse Hawkins is a lost 1924 American silent Western comedy film directed by Edward Sedgwick and starring Hoot Gibson. It was produced and distributed by Universal Pictures.

Plot 
Luke Hawkins (Hoot Gibson), a Jack-of-all-trades and resident of the western town of Lariat.  An old fashioned theatrical troupe visits the town, and Luke falls in love with its leading lady, Mary Darling (Anne Cornwall).

Luke heads to New York to follow Mary.  He takes another series of jobs, and eventually finds work as an extra in Mary's new production. Just as the play is about to flop, Luke's rush to take her in his arms turns the show into a hit.

Cast

Themes 
40-Horse Hawkins involves several cliches of the day.  The Luke Hawkins character is typical of the Western country boy "fish out of water" tale when he finds himself in the city-of-cities, New York.  The film offers a nostalgic look at the touring theatre companies of the day, and offers the typical cliche of mustache-twirling villain (Richard Tucker) and a grand leading woman (Helen Holmes).

See also
 Hoot Gibson filmography
 List of American films of 1924

References

External links

 
 

1924 films
Films directed by Edward Sedgwick
Lost Western (genre) comedy films
Universal Pictures films
1920s Western (genre) comedy films
Lost American films
1924 lost films
1924 comedy films
Silent American Western (genre) comedy films
1920s American films
1920s English-language films